Hailey Baptiste and Whitney Osuigwe were the defending champions but chose not to participate.

Sophie Chang and Angela Kulikov won the title, defeating Hanna Chang and Elizabeth Mandlik in the final, 6–3, 2–6, [10–6].

Seeds

Draw

Draw

References
Main Draw

Orlando USTA Pro Circuit Event 2 - Doubles